William McAllister ( – after 1932) was a Scottish professional footballer who played as an inside forward or wing half in the Scottish League for Hamilton Academical, St Mirren, Raith Rovers and Heart of Midlothian and in the Football League for Brighton & Hove Albion, Middlesbrough and Queens Park Rangers. He also played for clubs including Milngavie Allander, Maryhill, Renton, Johnstone, Ebbw Vale, Dolphin and Glentoran.

References

1900s births
Year of death missing
Footballers from Glasgow
Scottish footballers
Association football inside forwards
Association football wing halves
Maryhill F.C. players
Hamilton Academical F.C. players
Renton F.C. players
St Mirren F.C. players
Johnstone F.C. players
Ebbw Vale F.C. players
Brighton & Hove Albion F.C. players
Queens Park Rangers F.C. players
Raith Rovers F.C. players
Heart of Midlothian F.C. players
Glentoran F.C. players
Scottish Junior Football Association players
Scottish Football League players
Southern Football League players
English Football League players
League of Ireland players
NIFL Premiership players